Louis I. Say (February 4, 1854 – June 5, 1930) was an American professional baseball player who played in seven seasons for the Baltimore Marylands, Baltimore Canaries and Washington Nationals of the National Association, the Cincinnati Reds of the National League, Philadelphia Athletics and Baltimore Orioles of the American Association, the Baltimore Monumentals and the Kansas City Cowboys of the Union Association in the early days of Major League Baseball. He was born in Baltimore, Maryland and died in Fallston, Maryland at the age of 76.  He was the brother of Jimmy Say.

Say is the only player in baseball history to record more than 100 errors (102) in a season while playing in fewer than 100 games.

References

External links

Baseball players from Baltimore
Baltimore Marylands players
Baltimore Canaries players
Washington Nationals (NA) players
Kansas City Cowboys (UA) players
Cincinnati Reds (1876–1879) players
Philadelphia Athletics (AA) players
Baltimore Orioles (AA) players
Baltimore Monumentals players
Major League Baseball shortstops
1854 births
1930 deaths
19th-century baseball players
Manchester (minor league baseball) players
Philadelphia Athletic players
Buffalo (minor league baseball) players
Lynn Live Oaks players
Worcester (minor league baseball) players
Albany (minor league baseball) players
New York Metropolitans (minor league) players
Omaha Omahogs players
Keokuk Hawkeyes players
Utica Pent Ups players
Milwaukee Brewers (minor league) players
Eau Claire Lumbermen players
Charleston Seagulls players
Bridgeport Giants players
Haverhill (minor league baseball) players